The Emblem of Andhra Pradesh is the official state emblem of Andhra Pradesh, India.

History
In 1956, after the formation of the United Andhra Pradesh, the Government of Andhra Pradesh embraced a Poornaghatam of Amaravati stupa along with an Ashoka chakra and the four lion heads as its official emblem on the occasion of the 2,500 Buddha Jayanthi. A sun radiant charged with a treasure vase, placed within an orna­mented circular frame. In base the crest of the Republic of India. "Government of Andhra Pradesh", the name of the state repeated in Hindi and Telugu. In base the motto of India "Satyameva Jayate" in devanagi­ri.

Current design
The Government of Andhra Pradesh on 14 November 2018 finalized its new emblem for official use, four years after the state bifurcation in 2014. N. Chandrababu Naidu led government, issued a notification on adoption of the new state emblem which is inspired by the Amravati School of Art and consists of ‘Dhamma Chakka’ which is the ‘Wheel of Law’. The ‘Dhamma Chakka’ is embelished with a ring of ‘triratnas’ alterating with pinnate leaves and precious stones’. “The three circles of decorative beads in ascending order of numbers – 48 in the inner, 118 in the middle and 148 in the outer circle,”  At the hub of the Dhamma Chakka is the ‘Puna Ghataka’ which is known as the ‘Vase of Plenty’, is decorated with a four banded garland on the main body with medallions and tassels. “There is a braid around the thin neck and a flaring mouth,” surrounding with text in Telugu, English and Sanskrit.
The official release also stated that the emblem should never be reduced to a size of less than 24 mm in height. 
Soorisetty Anjineyulu, a drawing master from Nellore is the creator of the emblem, which was selected out of 300 emblems that were submitted.

Government banner
The Government of Andhra Pradesh can be represented by a banner displaying the emblem of the state on a white field.

See also
 National Emblem of India
 List of Indian state emblems

References

Government of Andhra Pradesh
Andhra Pradesh
Andhra Pradesh
Andhra Pradesh